Chaos: The Battle of Wizards is a turn-based tactics video game released for the ZX Spectrum in 1985. It was written by Julian Gollop and originally published by Games Workshop. Based on Gollop's 1982 design for a board game / card game hybrid, Chaos received a positive reception and went on to influence various games, including Darwinia and  King's Bounty, and spawned a sequel, Lords of Chaos, in 1990.

Gameplay

In the game Chaos, players take the role of wizards who vie with one another to win the game. The aim of the game is to be the 'last wizard standing' by destroying all other wizards. The game allows for anything between two and eight wizards, any of whom can be human or computer-controlled. The level of the computer-controlled wizards must be selected, ranging from 1 to 8. Higher levels improve the computer wizards' combat statistics, but do not improve their artificial intelligence. Computer-controlled wizards do not cooperate; they will attempt to kill each other as well as the human players.

Each wizard is given a random selection of spells at the start of the game with which to defeat the other wizards. Spells are either Lawful, Neutral, or Chaotic, and have a difficulty value expressed as a percentage chance of success when cast. A spell can only be cast once, with the exception of the "Disbelieve" spell which is always available to every wizard. New spells can only be acquired via the "Magic Wood" spell. During the game, the type of spells cast affects the subsequent difficulty of other spells. Casting many lawful spells results in a more lawful environment, which in turn makes other lawful spells easier to cast. The same principle applies to chaotic spells. Spells of the opposite alignment are not more difficult to cast however. Neutral spells are unaffected either way, and are always cast at the same difficulty percentage. This feature has a big impact on the strategy of the game, as a viable tactic is to cast many easy spells of a certain alignment, in order to make it easier to cast the more powerful spells of that alignment.

Spells fall into various categories and have various ranges. Creature spells summon a monster adjacent to the wizard, which can then be moved in the movement phase. Some creatures are more difficult to cast than others, with the more powerful creatures having a lower base percentage chance to cast. Creatures have attack and defense ratings which govern how effective they are, move ratings which control how many squares they can move a turn, maneuver ratings which govern how easily a creature can break off combat and magic resistance for governing defense against magical assaults. Wizards also have these ratings, as well as a magic rating governing how many spells they initially have. Several spells create objects on the board. A player may also receive spells that improve his wizard, such as "Magic Sword" or "Shadow Form", or spells that directly attack other creatures, such as "Magic Bolt" or "Vengeance".

Each (human) wizard takes it in turn to view the board (if desired), examine their spells and select one to cast on the next turn (selecting a spell is not compulsory). Typically, the other human players look away during a spell choice to avoid an unfair advantage. Once all players have chosen their spell, they attempt to cast them in order. Whereas the human players select their spells before each turn begins, the computer wizards actually select their spells during the play stage of each turn. This is not documented, although it becomes apparent in play, as the computer wizards often cast spells that would have required foreknowledge of the other players' actions. Once all spells have been cast, surviving wizards take it in turns to move themselves and any creatures under their control (unless they are 'engaged' in combat), and attack other wizards/creatures.

Other creatures or wizards are attacked by either moving into them, or flying onto them. Moving or flying next to an enemy creature automatically 'engages' them, and allows for an immediate attack. If an attack is successful the enemy creature disappears/dies and the attacking creature moves onto its square. Flying onto a creature allows an attack, but the flying creature remains in place unless it succeeds in killing its target, in which case it takes its place as above. Success depends on the attacking creature's combat rating against the defending creature's defense rating and a certain amount of randomness. Some creatures have ranged combat, allowing them to attack other creatures from afar, so long as there is a clear line of sight. Once all wizards have taken it in turn to move and fight, the turn sequence starts over from the beginning. For human players, no actions are compulsory, they may simply skip any actions they do not want to take. Computer-controlled wizards will always move, unless in a Magic Wood, Castle or Citadel, even when it is not in their best interest to do so. Likewise all computer-controlled creatures always attempt to move each turn. If a wizard is destroyed, all his creations immediately vanish too.

Development
Chaos was created entirely by Julian Gollop, based on his 1982 design for a traditional card game, itself inspired by the early Games Workshop board game Warlock. He was an avid card game designer and saw computers as a way of hiding game rules too complicated for pen-and-paper scenarios. Thus the board used in the card game became the tiled map in the video game.

Reception
CRASH awarded Chaos 8 out of 10, praising the neatness of the presentation, efficient sound effects, pleasing sprites and concluding that it was a very good multiplayer strategy game. Criticisms included the sparseness of the initial playing area, lack of status report for the wizards and information on how much damage was being dealt. The reviewer also felt there could have been a wider range of missile attack spells. Sinclair User rated Chaos 4 out of 5 stars, calling it "fast-moving and colourful" with simple, functional graphics. It was seen to be complex enough to appeal to players of both Dungeons & Dragons and strategy games. White Dwarf awarded  it 7 out of 10, finding particular fun in the spells "Magic Fire" and "Gooey Blob" but criticised the poor quality of the instruction booklet.

Legacy

In the final issue of Your Sinclair in 1993, Chaos was listed at fifth place of the Your Sinclair Readers' Top 100 Games Of All Time. In 2006, GamesTM listed Chaos at position 44 of the top 100 games of all time. This made it the second highest rated Spectrum game, behind Manic Miner.

One of Jagex's early games was Cyber Wars – a browser-based online multiplayer clone of Chaos that switched the fantasy theme of the game for a sci-fi one; it was part of the Castle Games Domain online lobby. Developers of the indie PC strategy game Darwinia cite Chaos as an influence during its early development. Chaos has also been the subject of many homebrew remakes such as Chaos Funk: Gollop regularly receives requests from people wishing to create remakes.

In March 2014, Gollop began raising funds for Chaos Reborn on Kickstarter. The project, described as "part sequel, part re-imagining of [the] original game" exceeded its target within a month, raising $210,854 out of its $180,000 goal, and was released in October 2015.

References

External links 
 
 
 A USENET message describing the internal structure of Chaos and naming the missing spells
 Chaos Online, detailed analysis of Chaos and discussion of Chaos Reborn

1985 video games
Europe-exclusive video games
Fantasy video games
Multiplayer and single-player video games
Multiplayer hotseat games
Turn-based tactics video games
Video games developed in the United Kingdom
ZX Spectrum games
ZX Spectrum-only games